Ainara Elbusto Arteaga (born 10 September 1992) is a Spanish racing cyclist, who currently rides for UCI Women's Continental Team .

References

External links
 

1992 births
Living people
Spanish female cyclists
Place of birth missing (living people)
People from Estella Oriental
Cyclists from Navarre